Morning, also known as Morning Statue, is an outdoor sculpture by Donal Hord, installed at San Diego's Embarcadero Marina Park North, in the U.S. state of California. The 6-foot, 3-inch black granite statue depicts a muscular young man stretching. It was created between 1951 and 1956, and was kept at Hord's residence until being acquired by the Port of San Diego in 1983.

See also

 1956 in art

References

External links
 

1956 establishments in California
1956 sculptures
Granite sculptures in California
Outdoor sculptures in San Diego
Sculptures of men in California
Statues in San Diego